Peeter Lindau (3 October 1886 Kaisma Parish (now Põhja-Pärnumaa Parish), Kreis Pernau – ?) was an Estonian politician. He was a member of II Riigikogu. He was a member of the Riigikogu since 29 January 1925. He replaced Jaan Velt. On 5 June 1925, he resigned his position and he was replaced by Hindrik Anto.

References

1886 births
Year of death missing
People from Põhja-Pärnumaa Parish
People from Kreis Pernau
Workers' United Front politicians
Members of the Riigikogu, 1923–1926